Firestorm is a 1998 action thriller film directed by Dean Semler and starring Howie Long, Scott Glenn, William Forsythe, and Suzy Amis.

Plot
During a forest fire in northern Wyoming, smokejumper Jesse Graves (Howie Long) and his mentor Wynt Perkins (Scott Glenn) are rescuing trapped civilians in a forest fire when a woman begs them to rescue her daughter from a burning cabin. They locate the girl, but Wynt is injured by a travel trailer sent flying by an explosion. Jesse manages to free Wynt and rescue both him and the girl from a flashover; Wynt's injuries mean that he must retire from active duty as a smokejumper, but he balks at the idea of "full" retirement due to his inadequate pension plan.

Months later, a group of Wyoming State convicts stage an escape with the help of an arsonist on the outside, who sets fire in the forest so that the prisoners will be taken there to help firemen, giving the prisoners a chance to escape. Randall Alexander Shaye (William Forsythe), who had stolen US$37 million four years previously and hidden it in the Wyoming forest, kills his cellmate and takes his identity as he and five other escapees go to retrieve the money. They pose as Canadian firefighters and take Jennifer (Suzy Amis), a bird watcher, hostage along the way. Unbeknownst to all of them, another forest fire has started due to a lightning strike from a week earlier.

Jesse, realizing that the "firefighters" are convicts in disguise, must find a way to stop Shaye and his group of convicts and save Jennifer at the same time. Over the course of the film, Shaye starts to kill off his men in order to collect the money himself, starting with fellow prisoners Wilkins, a mapmaker and Karge, a former wrestler, but finds out that the money was destroyed in the fire. He then proceeds to kill Loomis, a former Air Force pilot by pushing him off a cliff to make it look like an accident, and shoots Packer, a serial rapist, after he gets caught in a spring trap set up by Jesse. Wynt does everything he can to help Jesse, and to save Jennifer.

Jennifer tells Jesse that she was a Marine, before she became a bird watcher. She and Jesse try to give out smoke signals to have his friends find him before the two separate forest fires will collide and will suck up all the oxygen. Wynt arrives to save a busload of prisoners and fire fighters when they were forced at gunpoint to get inside the vehicle. He hotwires the bus and drives it away to safety. Wynt then catches up with Jesse and comes up with a plan. Jesse begins to realize his friend knew that there was a fire from the beginning and never told anyone.

Wynt tells Jesse he started the forest fire in order for a land developer to build a training school for fire fighters, but knew nothing of the prison break. Jesse tells him it wasn't his fault and promises he will keep his crime a secret from his friends. Wynt confronts Shaye by telling him Shaye's lawyers set him up to take the fall. He shoots Shaye in the leg, but is killed in the process. Jesse throws a fire axe into Shaye's chest, causing him to fall off the boat he and Jennifer were in. Jesse and Jennifer use the boat as an air pocket to keep from drowning, and to prevent themselves from getting burned alive as the firestorm destroys the area. Suddenly, gunshots start coming from underneath them and a couple of bullets make a hole in the boat.

Shaye survives his injury and plans on killing Jennifer and Jesse. Jesse gets the upper hand and kills Shaye by shoving his head through the hole under the boat, burning him to death. Heavy rainfall then drowns out the fire and Jesse and Jennifer swim to shore, where they wait to be rescued. Jennifer also realizes that the eggs she had with her have hatched, much to the pleasure of Jesse.

Cast
 Howie Long as Chief Jesse Graves
 Scott Glenn as Wynt Perkins
 William Forsythe as Randall Alexander Shaye
 Suzy Amis as Jennifer, Ornithologist
 Christianne Hirt as Monica
 Garwin Sanford as Pete
 Sebastian Spence as 'Cowboy'
 Michael Greyeyes as Andy
 Barry Pepper as Packer
 Vladimir Kulich as Karge
 Tom McBeath as Loomis
 Benjamin Ratner as Wilkins
 Jonathon Young as Sherman
 Chilton Crane as Tina’s Mom
 Robyn Driscoll as Tina’s Dad
 Alexandria Mitchell as Tina
 Terry Kelly as Lawyer
 David Fredericks as Guard
 Gavin Buhr as Childs
 Danny Wattley as Moody
 Derek Hamilton as Dwyer
 Adrien Dorval as Belcher
 Jon Cuthbert as Davis
 Sean Campbell as Deputy
 Deryl Hayes as Sheriff Garrett

Scott Glenn, who played the firefighter turned arsonist in the film, also starred in Backdraft (1991), where, coincidentally, also played the part of a Chicago firefighter who was an arsonist.

Production
The screenplay for the film, written on spec by Chris Soth as his thesis for the MFA Screenwriting program at USC, was originally purchased by the now defunct Savoy Pictures. When Savoy had the project, the film was going to be more epic in scale, with comprehensive visual and computer effects. Savoy even offered Sylvester Stallone $20 million to star, which he accepted. However, the studio went bust before the film was made. Twentieth Century Fox picked up the script from "turnaround" and fashioned it into a more intimate, smaller budgeted movie as they were looking to only spend $30 million on the picture. Graham Yost did an uncredited production polish on the script, which was also rewritten by four other writers on the way to production .

Reception
The film opened to very negative reviews, receiving a Rotten Tomatoes rating of 12% based on 26 reviews. The critic consensus reads “Firestorm fails to ignite ex-pro footballer Howie Long's career...or anything else for that matter.”

Box office
The film was a bomb at the box office. It opened in 7th place with a paltry $3.8 million (behind six films that had all been released at least three weeks earlier) and took in only $8.1 million in the United States during its theatrical run.

See also
 List of firefighting films

References

External links

 
 
 
 

1998 films
1990s disaster films
American action thriller films
1998 action thriller films
American disaster films
Films about firefighting
Films about arson
20th Century Fox films
Films scored by J. Peter Robinson
Films produced by Jeph Loeb
Films about wildfires
1990s English-language films
1990s American films